In topology, a branch of mathematics, an extension topology is a topology placed on the disjoint union of a topological space and another set.  There are various types of extension topology, described in the sections below.

Extension topology 
Let X be a topological space and P a set disjoint from X. Consider in X ∪ P the topology whose open sets are of the form A ∪ Q, where A is an open set of X and Q is a subset of P.

The closed sets of X ∪ P are of the form B ∪ Q, where B is a closed set of X and Q is a subset of P.

For these reasons this topology is called the extension topology of X plus P, with which one extends to X ∪ P the open and the closed sets of X.  As subsets of X ∪ P the subspace topology of X is the original topology of X, while the subspace topology of P is the discrete topology.  As a topological space, X ∪ P is homeomorphic to the topological sum of X and P, and X is a clopen subset of X ∪ P.

If Y is a topological space and R is a subset of Y, one might ask whether the extension topology of Y – R plus R is the same as the original topology of Y, and the answer is in general no.

Note the similarity of this extension topology construction and the Alexandroff one-point compactification, in which case, having a topological space X which one wishes to compactify by adding a point ∞ in infinity, one considers the closed sets of X ∪ {∞} to be the sets of the form K, where K is a closed compact set of X, or B ∪ {∞}, where B is a closed set of X.

Open extension topology 
The open extension topology of  plus  is  Let .

If Y a topological space and R is a subset of Y, one might ask whether the open extension topology of Y – R plus R is the same as the original topology of Y, and the answer is in general no.

 If  is finite,  is compact.
  is connected.
 If  has a single point,  is ultraconnected.

For a set Z and a point p in Z, one obtains the excluded point topology construction by considering in Z the discrete topology and applying the open extension topology construction to Z – {p} plus p.

Closed extension topology 
Let X be a topological space and P a set disjoint from X. Consider in X ∪ P the topology whose closed sets are of the form X ∪ Q, where Q is a subset of P, or B, where B is a closed set of X.

For this reason this topology is called the closed extension topology of X plus P, with which one extends to X ∪ P the closed sets of X.  As subsets of X ∪ P the subspace topology of X is the original topology of X, while the subspace topology of P is the discrete topology.

The open sets of X ∪ P are of the form Q, where Q is a subset of P, or A ∪ P, where A is an open set of X.  Note that P is open in X ∪ P and X is closed in X ∪ P.

If Y is a topological space and R is a subset of Y, one might ask whether the closed extension topology of Y – R plus R is the same as the original topology of Y, and the answer is in general no.

Note that the closed extension topology of X ∪ P is smaller than the extension topology of X ∪ P.

For a set Z and a point p in Z, one obtains the particular point topology construction by considering in Z the discrete topology and applying the closed extension topology construction to Z – {p} plus p.

Notes

Works cited 

Topological spaces
Topology